Almohadites is an extinct genus of cephalopod belonging to the ammonite subclass.

References

Late Cretaceous ammonites
Ammonite genera